Sascha Lense (born 5 October 1975) is a German football coach and former player.

He made nearly 100 appearances in the 2. Bundesliga in the 1990s. On 7 December 2021, Lense was hired by Manchester United as a sports psychologist to work under interim manager Ralf Rangnick.

References

External links

1975 births
Living people
German footballers
Germany youth international footballers
FSV Frankfurt players
FSV Zwickau players
SpVgg Unterhaching players
Dynamo Dresden players
SV Darmstadt 98 players
2. Bundesliga players
Association football midfielders
Manchester United F.C. non-playing staff